Arcellinid testate amoebae or Arcellinida, Arcellacean or lobose testate amoebae are single-celled protists partially enclosed in a simple test (shell).

Arcellinid testate amoebae are commonly found in soils, leaf litter, peat bogs and near/in fresh water. They use their pseudopodia, a temporary cell extension, for moving and taking in food. Like most amoebae, they are generally believed to reproduce asexually via binary fission. However a recent review suggests that sexual recombination may be the rule rather than the exception in amoeboid protists in general, including the Arcellinid testate amoebae.

Test or shell
Simple tests are made by secretion (autogenous tests), agglutination of foreign material (xenogenous tests), or sometimes a combination of both. Past environmental changes can be determined by analysing the composition of fossil tests, including the reconstruction of past climate change. Testate amoebae species have been used to reconstruct hydrological changes over the late Holocene, as a result of individual species possessing a narrow tolerance for ecohydrological conditions such as water-table depth or pH.

Evolutionary history

Fossils of arcellinid testate amoebae date back to the Tonian stage of the Proterozoic, around 789-759 million years ago. The fossils indicate that by 730 million years ago, arcellinids had already diversified into major lineages.

Testate amoebae are theorized to be mostly polyphyletic (coming from more than one ancestral type), but testaceafilosea, one group of testate amoebae, are theorized to be monophyletic. Ancient tests of terrestrial fauna are commonly found in fossilized amber, although mid-Cretaceous testate amoeba (i.e., Diffligia, Cucurbitella) have been found in ancient lake sediments. It is likely that the group has evolved minimally over the course of the Phanerozoic.

Classification

The classification of Arcellinida, as of 2019:
 Suborder Phryganellina Bovee 1985
 Family Phryganellidae Jung 1942
 Phryganella Penard 1902
 Family Cryptodifflugiidae Jung 1942
 ?Prantlitina Vasicek & Ruzicka 1957
 ?Pseudocucurbitella Gauthier-Lievre & Thomas 1960
 ?Pseudowailesella Sudzuki 1979
 Cryptodifflugia Penard 1890 [Difflugiella Cash 1904; Geococcus Francé 1913 non Green 1902]
 Meisterfeldia Bobrov 2016
 Wailesella Deflandre 1928
 Suborder Organoconcha Lahr et al. 2019
 Family Microchlamyiidae Ogden 1985
 Microchlamys Cockerell 1911 [Pseudochlamys Claparede & Lachmann 1859 non Lacordaire 1848 non Comas 1977]
 Pyxidicula Ehrenberg 1838 non Ehrenberg 1834 non Strelnikova & Nikolajev 1986
 Spumochlamys Kudryavtsev & Hausmann 2007
 Suborder Glutinoconcha Lahr et al. 2019
 Infraorder Volnustoma Lahr et al. 2019
 Family Heleoperidae Jung 1942
 Awerintzewia Schouteden 1906
 Heleopera Leidy 1879
 Infraorder Hyalospheniformes Lahr et al. 2019
 Family Hyalospheniidae Schulze, 1977 [Nebelidae Taranek 1882]
 ?Apolimia Korganova 1987
 ?Deflandria Jung 1942
 ?Heleoporella Couteaux 1978
 ?Leidyella Jung 1942
 ?Metaheleopera Bartos 1954
 ?Marsipos Medioli et al. 1990
 ?Paranebela Jung 1942
 ?Penardiella Kahl 1930
 ?Pseudogeamphorella Décloitre 1964 nomen nudum
 ?Pseudohyalosphenia Stepanek 1967 nomen nudum
 ?Pterygia Jung 1942 non Roeding 1798 non Link 1807 non Laporte 1832
 ?Schaudinnia Jung 1942 non Schulze 1900
 ?Umbonaria Jung 1942
 Alabasta Duckert et al. 2018
 Alocodera Jung 1942a
 Apodera Loeblich & Tappan 1961
 Certesella Loeblich & Tappan 1961
 Cornutheca Kosakyan et al. 2016
 Gibbocarina Kosakyan et al. 2016
 Hyalosphenia Stein 1859
 Longinebela Kosakyan et al. 2016
 Mrabella Kosakyan et al. 2016
 Nebela Leidy 1875
 Padaungiella Lara & Todorov 2012
 Planocarina Kosakyan et al. 2016
 Porosia Jung 1942
 Quadrulella Cockerell 1909 [Quadrula Schulze 1875 non Rafinesque 1820]
 Infraorder Excentrostoma Lahr et al. 2019
 ?Centropyxiella Valkanov 1970
 ?Oopyxis Jung 1942
 Family Centropyxidae 
 Armipyxis Dekhtiar 2009
 Centropyxis Stein 1857 [Echinopyxis Claparede & Lachmann 1859 non Pantocsek 1913; Collaripyxidia Zivkovic 1975; Toquepyxis Laminger 1971]
 Conicocassis Nasser & Patterson 2015
 Proplagiopyxis Schönborn 1964
 Family Plagiopyxidae 
 Bullinularia Deflandre 1953 [Bullinula Penard 1911]
 Geoplagiopyxis Chardez 1961
 Hoogenraadia GauthierLievre & Thomas 1958
 Paracentropyxis Bonnet 1960
 Plagiopyxis Penard 1910
 Planhoogenraadia Bonnet 1977
 Protoplagiopyxis Bonnet 1962
 Infraorder Longithecina Lahr et al. 2019
 Family Lesquereusiidae  [Paraquadrulidae Deflandre 1953]
 Fabalesquereusia Snegovaya & Alekperov 2005
 Lesquereusia Schlumberger 1845
 Microquadrula Golemansky 1968
 Paraquadrula Deflandre 1932
 Pomoriella Golemansky 1970
 Family Difflugiidae Wallich 1864
 ?Lagenodifflugia Medioli & Scott 1983
 ?Maghrebia Gauthier-Lievre & Thomas 1958
 ?Pentagonina Bovee & Jahn 1974 [Pentagonia Gauthier-Lievre & Thomas 1958 non Cozzens 1846; Falsidifflugia Haman 1988]
 ?Pseudopontigulasia Oye 1956
 ?Sexangularia Awerintzew 1906
 ?Suiadifflugia Green 1975
 ?Zivkovicia Ogden 1987
 Armatodifflugia Snegovaya & Alekperov 2005
 Difflugia Leclere 1815 ex Lamarck 1816
 Mediolus Patterson 2014
 Nabranella Snegovaya & Alekperov 2009
 Pelecyamoeba Snegovaya & Alekperov 2005
 Pontigulasia Rhumbler 1895
 Pseudonebela Gauthier-Lievre 1954 non Schönborn 1964
 Infraorder Sphaerothecina Kosakyan et al. 2016
 ?Cornuapyxis Couteaux & Chardez 1981
 ?Cucurbitella Penard 1902 non Walpers 1846
 ?Ellipsopyxella Bonnet 1975
 ?Ellipsopyxis Bonnet 1965
 ?Protocucurbitella Gauthier-Lievre & Thomas 1960 non Naumov
 Family Distomatopyxidae Bonnet 1970
 Distomatopyxis Bonnet 1970
 Family Lamtopyxidae Bonnet 1974
 Lamtopyxis Bonnet 1974
 Family Netzeliidae Kosakyan et al. 2016 [Cyclopyxidae Schönborn 1989]
 Cyclopyxis Bonnet 1953
 Netzelia Ogden 1979
 Family Arcellidae Ehrenberg 1832
 Antarcella Ehrenberg 1838
 Arcella Deflandre 1928 [Arcellina Carter 1856 non DuPlessis 1876 non Haeckel 1894; Cyphidium Ehrenberg 1837 non Magnus 1875; Leptocystis Playfair 1918]
 Trigonopyxidae Loeblich 1964
 Geopyxella Bonnet & Thomas 1955
 Trigonopyxis Penard 1912
Arcellinida incertae sedis:
 Argynnia Vucetich, 1974
 Awerintzewia Schouteden, 1906
 Geamphorella Bonnet, 1959
 Jungia Loeblich & Tappan 1961
 Lagenodifflugia Medioli & Scott, 1983
 Lamtoquadrula Bonnet 1975
 Leptochlamys West 1901
 Maghrebia Gauthier-Lievre & Thomas, 1960
 Ochros Medioli et al. 1990
 †Palaeoleptochlamys Strullu-Derrien et al. 2019
 Physochila Jung 1942
 Pseudawerintzewia Bonnet 1959
 Sacculus Medioli et al. 1990 non Gosse 1851 non Hirase 1927 non Neviani 1930
 Schoenbornia Decloitre 1964
 Swabia 
 Family Bipseudostomatidae Snegovaya & Alekperov 2005
 Bipseudostomatella Snegovaya & Alekperov 2005
 Gomocollariella Snegovaya & Alekperov 2005
 Family Mississippiellidae Huddleston & Haman 1985
 Mississippiella Haman 1982
 Family Shamkiriidae Snegovaya & Alekperov 2005
 Shamkiriella Snegovaya & Alekperov 2005

References

External links
 ISTAR, the International Society for Testate Amoeba Research
 Tree of Life: Arcellinida
 An article by G. T. Swindles
 Protozoa: The testate amoebae
 BioImages: The Virtual Field-Guide (UK) - TESTACEA (Testate amoebae)
 Pictures of testate amoebae
The Cushman Foundation Thecamoebian Page

Amoebozoa orders
Tubulinea